Gornozavodsk is the name of several inhabited localities in Russia.

Urban localities
Gornozavodsk, Perm Krai, a town in Gornozavodsky District of Perm Krai

Rural localities
Gornozavodsk, Sakhalin Oblast, a selo in Nevelsky District of Sakhalin Oblast; until 2004—a town